The 400-series highways are a network of controlled-access highways throughout the southern portion of the Canadian province of Ontario, forming a special subset of the provincial highway system. They are analogous to the Interstate Highway System in the United States or the Autoroute system of neighbouring Quebec, and are regulated by the Ministry of Transportation of Ontario (MTO). The 400-series designations were introduced in 1952, although Ontario had been constructing divided highways for two decades prior. Initially, only Highways 400, 401 and 402 were numbered; other designations followed in the subsequent decades.

The design of 400-series highways has set the precedent for a number of innovations used throughout North America, including the parclo interchange and a modified Jersey barrier design known as the Ontario Tall Wall. As a result, they currently experience one of the lowest accident and fatality rates comparative to traffic volume in North America.

History 
When the 400-series designations were first applied to Ontario freeways in 1952,
several divided highways had already been opened in Southern Ontario.
Originally inspired by German Autobahns, Minister of Highways Thomas McQuesten planned a network of "Dual Highways" across the southern half of the province during the 1930s.
The Queen Elizabeth Way (QEW) was first, an upgrade to the partially constructed Middle Road in 1934.
McQuesten also sought out the economic opportunities that came with linking Toronto to Detroit and New York state by divided roadways with interchanges at major crossroads. Although he no longer served as Minister of Highways by the onset of World War II, his ambitious plans would come to fruition in the following decades as Highways 400, 401, 402, 403 (between Woodstock and Hamilton), and 405.

The construction boom following the war resulted in many new freeway construction projects in the province. The Toronto–Barrie Highway (Highway 400), Trans-Provincial Highway (Highway 401),
a short expansion of Highway 7 approaching the Blue Water Bridge in Sarnia (Highway 402),
and an expansion of Highway 27 (eventually designated as Highway 427 by the mid-1970s) into part of the Toronto Bypass were all underway or completed by the early 1950s. Seeking a way to distinguish the controlled-access freeways from the existing two-lane King's Highways, the Department of Highways created the 400-series designations in 1952. By the end of the year, Highway 400, 401, and 402 were numbered, although they were only short stubs of their current lengths. Highway 401 was assembled across the province in a patchwork fashion,
becoming fully navigable between Windsor and the Quebec border on November 10, 1964;
Highway 400 was extended north to Coldwater on Christmas Eve 1959;
Highway 402 was extended to London between 1972 and 1982.

In addition to this network backbone, plans for additional 400-series highways were initiated by the late 1950s, comprising the Chedoke Expressway (Highway 403) through Hamilton;
the Don Valley Parkway Extension (Highway 404) northward from the soon-to-be constructed Toronto expressway;
Highway 405 to connect with the American border near St. Catharines;
Highway 406 south from St. Catharines to Welland;
Highway 407 encircling the Greater Toronto Area (GTA), though not built for another 40 years;
Highway 409 to connect Highway 401 with Toronto International Airport;
and The Queensway (Highway 417) through Ottawa.
The first sections of these freeways were opened in 1963,
1977,
1963, 1965,
1997,
1974,
and 1960,
respectively.

Throughout the 1960s and 1970s, additional freeways were planned or built, including Highway 427 in Toronto,
Highway 403 through Mississauga,
Highway 410 north to Brampton and Highway 416 to connect Highways 401 and 417.
Highway 420 was designated in Niagara Falls,
though it had been built as part of the QEW in 1941. Other major works included the skyway bridges along the QEW and the expansion of Highway 401 through most of Toronto into twelve-lane collector–express systems.

By the mid-1980s, the network had more-or-less taken its current shape, with only Highways 407 and 416 yet to be built.
Instead, emphasis was placed on expanding existing routes to accommodate increasing traffic volumes. However, extensions of Highway 400 towards Parry Sound,
Highway 403 between Woodstock and Hamilton,
Highway 404 towards Newmarket,
and Highway 427 towards Vaughan were underway.
By the end of the decade, construction of Highway 407 and Highway 416 had begun,
and Highway 410 was expanded from two to four lanes.

Highways 407 and 416 opened in the late 1990s.
Until early 2015, Highways 407 and 416 were the most-recently designated (and constructed) freeways in Ontario.  This has changed with the construction of Highways 412 and 418.  In addition to these new additions to the 400-series network, several extensions of existing freeways have been built or are underway, including Highway 410 north of Brampton in 2009,
Highway 400 to north of Parry Sound in 2010,
Highway 417 to Arnprior in 2012,
Highway 404 to Keswick in 2014,
Highway 401 through Windsor in 2015,
and four-laning Highway 406 to Welland in late 2015.

Design standards 
The 400-series highways always have a minimum 4 lane cross-section with grade separation at all junctions. Interchanges tend to be spaced at least 1.5 kilometres apart in urban areas unless  there are basket weave ramps or collector lanes to facilitated shorter merge distances. In rural areas, interchanges tend to be spaced at least 3 kilometres apart, although exceptions exist. When the cross-section of highway is larger than 10 lanes, the road isusually arranged into a local–express lane system, which exist on sections of Highways 401, 403 and 427. On all but a few interchanges in the whole system, ramps merge freely on the highway except if there are ramp meters in use, and stop or yield controlled ramps are rare. An interchange with stop-controlled ramps onto Highway 400 at Canal Road is currently scheduled for replacement.

Of note are the Ontario Tall Wall median barrier and the Parclo A-4 interchange design, the latter which became standard in the design for the widening of Highway 401 through Toronto in 1962. The Institute of Traffic Engineers subsequently recommended this design to replace the cloverleaf interchange throughout North America.
Ontario highways ranks fourth in North America for fatality rates, with 0.61 fatalities per 10,000 licensed drivers in 2017. However, this also includes two-lane provincial highways.
Jeff Yurek had stated that "The 400-series highways were built for, I believe, a speed limit of 120 km/h safely."
A 110 km/h trial has been set up on select stretches to test the viability of increasing speed limits.

Conforming with the Manual on Uniform Traffic Control Devices, Ontario utilizes green signs for guidance purposes, including distances to nearby interchanges and destinations.
Generally, blue signage is used to list services and attractions at upcoming exits, known as Tourism-Oriented Directional Signing.
However, several exceptions exist, notably blue guidance signage for toll highways like Highway 407, in addition to the collector lanes of highways.
The baseline standard for the construction of or expansion to a freeway in Ontario is an average daily traffic count of 10,000 vehicles per day. However, other factors are considered as well, particularly future traffic volume forecasts. To promote economic development in a disadvantaged region (e.g., the current extension of Highway 400 to Northern Ontario), a 400-series highway may be built where the existing highway's traffic counts fall below 10,000.

The MTO plans and finances the construction and maintenance of the King's Highway system, which includes the 400-series network.
The system includes  of freeways.

There are three examples of 400 series standard highways in Ontario that are not signed as such. The Gardiner Expressway between Highway 427 and Parklawn Road was originally built as a section of QEW (Hwy 451) and therefore is built to 400 series standards but lost its QEW designation after being downloaded to the City of Toronto. The section of Highway 7 between the town of Carleton Place and its junction with Highway 417 is also built to 400 series standards, but a 400 series designation is yet to be applied. Highway 69 between Sudbury and Key River is built to 400 series standards in anticipation of it becoming part of Highway 400 once once the 70 kilometre gap between the two freeways is filled. Most other freeways and expressways in Ontario that lack a 400 series designation have lower construction standards, lower design speeds and lower speed limits.

High-occupancy vehicle lanes 

The MTO began planning for the use of high-occupancy vehicle (HOV) lanes with the HOV Opportunities Study, contracted to  McCormick Rankin in 2001. This led to the test trial of three HOV lanes in the GTA in December 2005: southbound Highway 404 between Highway 7 and Highway 401, with a dedicated HOV ramp built to connect with westbound Highway 401, and Highway 403 in both directions between Highway 407 and Highway 401 in Mississauga.
Since then, HOV lanes have been opened on several 400-series freeways around the Golden Horseshoe and National Capital Region. In May 2007, the MTO introduced a multibillion-dollar Horseshoe Network Project, which included plans to incorporate HOV lanes into numerous 400-series highways.

By then, work was already advanced on several projects, including the northbound HOV lane on Highway 404 (that opened on July 23, 2007) and an HOV lane along both directions of Highway 403 between Highway 407 and Highway 401. A third pair of HOV lanes has since been introduced to the QEW/403 through Oakville, and a fourth individual HOV lane travels eastbound on Highway 417 from just west of Eagleson Road in Ottawa to just east of Moodie Drive.

Future plans include extending existing HOV lanes and introducing them to other 400-series freeways.
, two projects have been confirmed: Highway 410 between Highway 401 and Queen Street in Brampton, and Highway 427 between Highway 409 and Highway 7. The MTO has stated that HOV lanes will only be introduced through new construction and that no general-purpose lanes will be converted. The general goals of the project are to help increase highway efficiency (an HOV lane is claimed by the Ontario government to have the ability to move as many people as four general-purpose lanes), reduce congestion, conserve energy and help protect the environment.

During the 2015 Pan American Games and 2015 Parapan American Games held in Toronto, several HOV lanes had their minimum requirements increased from two passengers to three, and some highways had their general-purpose lanes temporarily converted to HOV lanes to accommodate increased traffic. These temporary restrictions lasted from June 29 to August 18.

2021 saw several new HOV lanes opened. The southbound HOV lane on Highway400 between King Road and Major Mackenzie Drive was opened on September11, 2021; while the northbound lane opened two months later on November11. The Highway427 extension, which opened on September18, included an HOV lane north of Finch Avenue.

Future HOV lanes 
The following table lists planned expansions to the HOV network by 2031.

Planned Extensions and New Routes

Existing Network

Gallery

See also 
 List of provincial highways in Ontario
 100-Series Highways of Nova Scotia
 400-series Highways of British Columbia
 Quebec Autoroutes

References

Sources

Bibliography

External links 

 Ontario Ministry of Transportation
 Highway Construction Programs
 Photographs and history on the 400-Series Highways (and other provincial highways, too)
 Dirt Roads to Freeways … And All That, ca.1970s, Archives of Ontario YouTube Channel

 
Ontario